was a village located in Yatsuka District, Shimane Prefecture, Japan.

As of 2003, the village had an estimated population of 6,931 and a density of 123.77 persons per km². The total area was 56.00 km².

On March 31, 2005, Yakumo, along with the towns of Kashima, Mihonoseki, Shimane, Shinji, Tamayu and Yatsuka (all from Yatsuka District), was merged into the expanded city of Matsue.

References

External links
  
  - Japanese version: 地方文化シリーズ： 「八雲国際演劇祭」

Dissolved municipalities of Shimane Prefecture